Jerusalem Boulevard (Hebrew: Sderot Yerushalayim), is a long historical avenue that crosses the city of Jaffa parallel to the shoreline a few hundred meters to the west, from the border of Tel Aviv to Bat Yam in the south (Sderot HaAtsma'ut) to the Yehezkel Kaufmann Street in the north, where it continues as a boulevard to the beach.

History

British Mandate
Soon after being appointed governor in 1914, Hassan Bey, also known as Hassan Bek, adopted an ambitious development programme for Jaffa that included the construction of an avenue connecting the seaside city with the orange groves at its outskirts. In 1915, during World War I, Hassan Bey paved the street using forced Jewish and Arab labor and named it Jamal Pasha Boulevard after his superior, the Ottoman governor of Greater Syria. 

In 1915, Jewish engineer Gedalyahu Wilbushewitz, the brother of Manya Shochat, was appointed Jaffa's director of public works by Sultan Mehmed V. Under Wilbushewitz' supervision the new thoroughfare was built and lined with trees: Washingtonia palm trees and ficus trees (sycomore and Chinese banyan), delivered by the Mikveh Yisrael agricultural school and planted by its students. In late 1917, British imperial troops occupied Jaffa and the avenue was renamed King George V Boulevard after the British monarch.

State of Israel
As of 2016, there were about 860 ficus trees along the length of Sderot Yerushalayim. For the construction of the Tel Aviv Light Rail, at least 29 of them will be removed and a further four will be relocated.

References

External links
 Sderot Yerushalayim on Panoramio

Streets in Tel Aviv